Dial M may refer to:

 Dial M (Philippine TV series), a public service talk show
 Dial M (UK TV series), a music television series
 Dial M (album), an album by Starflyer 59